Zunilito is a municipality in the Suchitepéquez department of Guatemala. It is situated at 790 m above sea level. It covers an area of 78 km2.

External links
Muni in Spanish

Municipalities of the Suchitepéquez Department